The  is a kei car built by the Japanese automaker Daihatsu from 2008 to 2017. It was a cosmetic variation of the L175 series Move. It had two engine options: a naturally-aspirated 658 cc KF-VE and a turbocharged 658 cc KF-DET three-cylinder petrol engines that produces  and  respectively. The Move Conte was also available in Custom model.

The Move Conte, along with the Pixis Space, were both discontinued in March 2017. The Move Canbus replaced the Move Conte, while the Pixis Space was later replaced by the Pixis Joy.

The name "Conte" is derived from the word "container", referring its boxy shape. The name also means "with you" in Italian.

Gallery 
Move Conte

Pixis Space

References 

Move Conte
Cars introduced in 2008
2010s cars
Kei cars
Hatchbacks
Front-wheel-drive vehicles
All-wheel-drive vehicles
Vehicles with CVT transmission